Ytre Sogn District Court was a district court in Sogn og Fjordane county, Norway. The court was based in the village of Høyanger. The court existed from around 1630 until 2005. It had jurisdiction over the municipalities located in the areas surrounding the outer Sognefjorden. This included the municipalities of Gulen, Solund, Hyllestad, Høyanger, Balestrand, and Vik. Cases from this court could be appealed to Gulating Court of Appeal.

The court was a court of first instance. Its judicial duties were mainly to settle criminal cases and to resolve civil litigation as well as bankruptcy. The administration and registration tasks of the court included death registration, issuing certain certificates, performing duties of a notary public, and officiating civil wedding ceremonies. Cases from this court were heard by a combination of professional judges and lay judges.

History
In 1591, the Sogn District Court was established when the district court system was implemented in Norway. Around 1630, the court's jurisdiction was split into Indre Sogn District Court in the east and Ytre Sogn District Court in the west. In 2005, the court was closed and its jurisdictional areas were split up among other neighboring courts. The municipalities of Solund, Hyllestad, and Høyanger joined the newly created Fjordane District Court to the north. The municipalities of Balestrand and Vik merged with the Indre Sogn District Court to form the new Sogn District Court. The municipality of Gulen joined the Nordhordland District Court which was based in the neighboring Hordaland county to the south.

References 

Defunct district courts of Norway
Courts and tribunals established in 1630
1630 establishments in Norway
Courts and tribunals disestablished in 2005
2005 disestablishments in Norway